Astele multigrana is a species of sea snail, a marine gastropod mollusk in the family Calliostomatidae.

Notes
Additional information regarding this species:
 Taxonomic remark: Some authors place this taxon in the subgenus Astele (Astelena)

Description
The height of the shell attains 14 mm. The light-yellow turreted-conic shell is narrowly umbilicate. The eight whorls are nearly plane. They are encircled by numerous unequal granuliferous riblets. The sutural cingula are elevated, subundulate, spirally striate, and pallidly tessellate. The base of the shell is a little convex. It is covered with about 16 subgranose alternately larger and more delicate riblets. The umbilicus is narrow, surrounded by a white plate. The oblique columella terminates in a pearly denticle. The aperture is subtetragonal.

Distribution
This marine species occurs off Southern Australia.

References

External links
 To Encyclopedia of Life
 To World Register of Marine Species
 

multigrana
Gastropods described in 1871